A total of 403 Olympians are known to have been killed during World War II.

Notes
A.The country the individual competed for at the time.

References

Olympians killed in warfare
Military personnel of World War II
Military personnel killed in World War II
Lists of people killed in World War II
Killed In World War II
Lists of sportspeople who died in wars